Hypotacha pulla is a species of moth in the family Erebidae. It is found in Namibia.

References

Moths described in 2004
Hypotacha
Moths of Africa